Arundhati Kirkire (born 31 May 1980) is an Indian former cricketer who played as a right-handed batter and occasional wicket-keeper. She appeared in one Test match and 30 One Day Internationals for India between 2000 and 2005. She played domestic cricket for Madhya Pradesh and Railways.

References

External links
 
 

1980 births
Living people
Cricketers from Indore
Indian women cricketers
India women Test cricketers
India women One Day International cricketers
Madhya Pradesh women cricketers
Railways women cricketers
Central Zone women cricketers
21st-century Indian women
21st-century Indian people
Wicket-keepers